Pterostylis is a genus of about 300 species of plants in the orchid family, Orchidaceae. Commonly called greenhood orchids, they are terrestrial, deciduous, perennial, tuberous, herbs found in Australia, New Zealand, New Guinea, New Caledonia and one Indonesian island. The flowers are mostly green, sometimes with brown, reddish or white stripes, and are distinguished from other orchids by their unusual flower structures and pollination mechanism.

Description
Greenhood orchids are all terrestrial herbs with an underground tuber like many other genera of orchids but are distinguished by a hood-like "galea" formed by the fusing of the dorsal sepal and two lateral petals. The galea curves forward, covers the sexual parts of the flower, is important in the pollination process and is about as long as the two petals. The dorsal sepal is  translucent white with green, reddish or brown stripes. The two lateral sepals are joined at their base, form the front of the flower and usually protrude to form "points" or "ears" which extend above or to the side of the galea. The third (medial) petal forms the highly modified labellum. As in other orchids, the sexual parts of the flower form part of the column and in all greenhoods, this structure has a pair of mostly translucent wings and is also important in pollination.

The tuber of a greenhood is usually more or less spherical in shape and lasts for about a year then dies. A new one is produced early in the life of the parent tuber at the same time as a new shoot is produced and continues to grow, reaching maturity at the end of the growing season. In some species, a larger number of "daughter" tubers grow, and a colony of orchids is produced. The leaves are either attached in a rosette to the base of the peduncle or "stalk" of the plant by a short petiole, or further up it, in which case the leaves are sessile. There may be one or several flowers on the peduncle.

The fruit of a greenhood is a dehiscent capsule containing up to 500 tiny seeds and is oblong to elliptic in shape with three ridges. Other parts of the flower wither soon after pollination and the dry remains are attached to the end of the capsule.

Taxonomy and naming
The first observation of Pterostylis by European botanists was probably by Joseph Banks when  visited Botany Bay in 1770 but any specimens collected were lost later in the voyage. The first formal description of a greenhood was by Jacques Labillardière who collected a specimen  from Bruny Island and gave it the name Disperis alata. After several name changes, Disperis alata is now known as Pterostylis alata. John White, the first surgeon-general of the colony of New South Wales collected several species and George Caley collected 208 greenhood specimens from 16 species and described them in great detail, including details of their habitat and gave them names like Druids Cap patersoni but did not publish his work.

The genus Pterostylis was first raised by Robert Brown who formally described 19 species but did not nominate a type species. The species he described were collected from the east coast of the mainland and from Tasmania and the descriptions were published in Prodromus Florae Novae Hollandiae.

Alan Cunningham was the first to describe a New Zealand species, P. banksii and John Lindley described the first four Western Australian species,  P. vittata, P. pyramidalis, P. barbata and P. scabra from specimens collected by James Drummond. About 300 species are recognised and about 200 of them have been formally described and named.

In 2001 the genus Pterostylis was split such that two new genera, Plumatichilos and Oligochaetochilus, were established based on morphological characters. These divisions effectively separated species with a thread-like, feathery labellum (Plumatichilos), and those with downward-curved lateral sepals (Oligochaetochilus) from the remaining Pterostylis species. The following year, David Jones and Mark Clements proposed further separating Pterostylis into sixteen genera based on a combination of molecular and morphological characters: the genera Bunochilus, Crangonorchis, Diplodium, Eremorchis, Hymenochilus, Linguella, Oligochaetochilus, Petrorchis, Pharochilum, Plumatichilos, Ranorchis, Speculantha, Stamnorchis, Taurantha and Urochilus. These changes were not adopted widely by Australian herbaria as the data appeared to support a monophyletic group. In 2010, further molecular work reinstated Pterostylis as a monophyletic group with two subgenera distinguishing species with lateral sepals that are bent sharply downwards ("deflexed") from those with the lateral sepals bent backwards ("recurved").

The genus name (Pterostylis) is derived from the Greek words pteron meaning 'wing' and stylos meaning 'pillar' or 'post', but in orchids, generally applies to the column.

The closest relative of Pterostylis is Achlydosa, restricted to New Caledonia and the sole other genus of subtribe Pterostylidinae.

Distribution and habitat
Orchids in the genus Pterostylis occur mostly in Australia but are also found in New Zealand, including some of its smaller islands such as Chatham Island, and in New Caledonia, New Guinea, New Britain, New Ireland and on Seram Island in Indonesia. In Australia they are found in all states and Lord Howe Island, but not in the Northern Territory. They grow in a wide range of habitats, especially in temperate zones and are found in grassland, heath, scrub, woodland and forest, including rainforest. They sometimes grow in semi-arid areas but usually near rocks or crevices where there is run-off during rain. In tropical regions they tend to grow at higher altitudes where temperatures are lower. Most have periods of dormancy which coincide with climatic extremes, surviving as small tubers until favourable conditions return.

Ecology
Most greenhoods are pollinated by insects, nearly always by tiny flies from the family Mycetophilidae or by mosquitoes (Family Culicidae). The insect approaches the flower from downwind, as if attracted by a scent and usually lands on the galea. (In the case of Pterostylis sanguinea, the pollinator is a male fungus gnat of the genus Mycomya which attempts to copulate with the labellum, which produces the chemical attractant.) The insect then enters the flower and either because it has passed a balance point, or because it has touched a sensitive part of the labellum, the labellum moves forward trapping the insect between the column wings, the labellum and other flower parts. Observation of the insect's reaction to entrapment is difficult to observe, but in its struggle to escape, it either deposits pollinia from a previously visited flower or contacts the sticky viscidium and pollinia are attached, then carried to another flower. The features of an actively-moving labellum, along with the galea, are unique to these orchids.

Uses

Use in horticulture 
Greenhoods are easily grown in pots and usually flower well, filling the pot in a few years. Pterostylis curta and P. nutans can be grown in commercial orchid potting mix with coarse gravel added. A bushhouse or cool glasshouse are needed for some species. Greenhoods need regular watering in the growing seaseon but must be kept dry when dormant.

Species
The following is a list of species of Pterostylis accepted by Plants of the World Online as at January 2023, apart from Pterostylis striata, a name that is accepted by the Australian Plant Census:

 Pterostylis abrupta D.L.Jones  – tablelands greenhood
 Pterostylis aciculiformis (Nicholls) M.A.Clem. & D.L.Jones – needle-point rustyhood, slender ruddyhood
 Pterostylis actites (D.L.Jones & C.J.French) D.L.Jones & C.J.French - coastal short-eared snail orchid
 Pterostylis acuminata R.Br. – sharp greenhood, pointed greenhood
 Pterostylis × aenigma D.L.Jones & M.A.Clem. – enigmatic greenhood
 Pterostylis aestiva D.L.Jones – long-tongued summer greenhood
 Pterostylis agathicola D.L.Jones, Molloy & M.A.Clem. – kauri greenhood (N.Z.)
 Pterostylis agrestis (D.L.Jones) G.N.Backh.
 Pterostylis alata (Labill.) Rchb.f. – striped greenhood
 Pterostylis allantoidea R.S.Rogers – shy greenhood
 Pterostylis alobula (Hatch) L.B.Moore  - winter greenhood (N.Z.)
 Pterostylis alpina R.S.Rogers – mountain greenhood
 Pterostylis alveata Garnet – coastal greenhood
 Pterostylis amabilis (D.L.Jones & L.M.Copel.) D.L.Jones 
 Pterostylis ampliata (D.L.Jones) D.L.Jones  – large autumn greenhood
 Pterostylis anaclasta (D.L.Jones) Janes & Duretto
 Pterostylis anatona D.L.Jones – Eungella greenhood
 Pterostylis aneba D.L.Jones
 Pterostylis angulata (D.L.Jones & C.J.French) D.L.Jones & C.J.French  – Helena River snail orchid, limestone snail orchid
 Pterostylis angusta A.S.George – narrow-hooded shell orchid, narrow shell orchid
 Pterostylis antennifera (D.L.Jones) D.L.Jones
 Pterostylis aphylla Lindl. – leafless greenhood
 Pterostylis aquilonia D.L.Jones & B.Gray – northern cobra greenhood
 Pterostylis arbuscula (D.L.Jones & C.J.French) D.L.Jones & C.J.French 
 Pterostylis arenicola M.A.Clem. & J.Stewart – sandhill rustyhood
 Pterostylis areolata Petrie (N.Z.)
 Pterostylis aspera D.L.Jones & M.A.Clem. – rough shell orchid
 Pterostylis atrans D.L.Jones – dark-tip greenhood, blunt-tongue greenhood
 Pterostylis atriola D.L.Jones – Snug greenhood
 Pterostylis atrosanguinea D.L.Jones & C.J.French
 Pterostylis auriculata Colenso (N.Z.)
 Pterostylis australis Hook.f. – southern greenhood (N.Z.)
 Pterostylis banksii A.Cunn. (N.Z.)
 Pterostylis baptistii Fitzg. – king greenhood
 Pterostylis barbata Lindl. – western bearded greenhood, bird orchid
 Pterostylis barringtonensis (D.L.Jones) G.N.Backh. – Barrington leafy greenhood
 Pterostylis basaltica D.L.Jones & M.A.Clem. – basalt rustyhood, basalt greenhood
 Pterostylis bicolor M.A.Clem. & D.L.Jones – black-tip greenhood
 Pterostylis bicornis D.L.Jones & M.A.Clem. – horned greenhood
 Pterostylis biseta Blackmore & Clemesha – bristled rustyhood
 Pterostylis boormanii Rupp – sikh's whiskers, baggy britches, or Boorroans green-hood
 Pterostylis borealis (D.L.Jones) D.L.Jones
 Pterostylis bracteatus (D.L.Jones & R.J.Bates) J.M.H.Shaw
 Pterostylis brevichila  D.L.Jones & C.J.French – dwarf shell orchid
 Pterostylis brevisepala (D.L.Jones & C.J.French) D.L.Jones & C.J.French
 Pterostylis brinsleyi (D.L.Jones) J.M.H.Shaw
 Pterostylis brumalis L.B.Moore – kauri greenhood (N.Z.)
 Pterostylis brunneola  D.L.Jones & C.J.French – giant snail orchid
 Pterostylis bryophila D.L.Jones – Hindmarsh Valley greenhood
 Pterostylis bureaviana Schltr. (New Caledonia)
 Pterostylis calceolus M.A.Clem. – Bungonia rustyhood
 Pterostylis caligna M.T.Mathieson
 Pterostylis cardiostigma D.Cooper (N.Z.)
 Pterostylis caulescens L.O.Williams (New Guinea)
 Pterostylis cernua D.L.Jones, Molloy & M.A.Clem. – Westland greenhood (N.Z.)
 Pterostylis chaetophora M.A.Clem. & D.L.Jones – Taree rustyhood, tall rusthood or ruddy hood
 Pterostylis cheraphila D.L.Jones & M.A.Clem. – floodplain rustyhood
 Pterostylis chlorogramma D.L.Jones & M.A.Clem. – green-striped leafy greenhood
 Pterostylis chocolatina (D.L.Jones) G.N.Backh. – chocolate-lip leafy greenhood
 Pterostylis ciliata M.A.Clem. & D.L.Jones – hairy rufous greenhood, tall rusthood or hairy rustyhood
 Pterostylis clavigera Fitzg. – hairy snail orchid
 Pterostylis clivicola (D.L.Jones) G.N.Backh.
 Pterostylis clivosa (D.L.Jones) D.L.Jones
 Pterostylis cobarensis M.A.Clem. – inland rustyhood, Cobar rustyhood
 Pterostylis coccina Fitzg. – scarlet greenhood
 Pterostylis collina (Rupp) M.A.Clem. & D.L.Jones – shiny bull orchid
 Pterostylis commutata D.L.Jones – midland rustyhood
 Pterostylis concava D.L.Jones & M.A.Clem. – pouched greenhood, cupped banded greenhood
 Pterostylis concinna R.Br. – trim greenhood
 Pterostylis conferta (D.L.Jones) G.N.Backh. – leprechaun greenhood, basalt midget greenhood
 Pterostylis conferta (D.L.Jones) G.N.Backh. subsp. conferta
 Pterostylis conferta subsp. occidentalis (R.J.Bates) J.M.H.Shaw 
 Pterostylis × conoglossa Upton
 Pterostylis corpulenta (D.L.Jones) D.L.Jones
 Pterostylis crassa (D.L.Jones) G.N.Backh. – coarse leafy greenhood
 Pterostylis crassicaulis (D.L.Jones & M.A.Clem.) G.N.Backh. – alpine swan greenhood
 Pterostylis crassichila D.L.Jones – plump northern greenhood
 Pterostylis crebra (D.L.Jones) D.L.Jones
 Pterostylis crebriflora (D.L.Jones & C.J.French) D.L.Jones & C.J.French
 Pterostylis crispula (D.L.Jones & C.J.French) D.L.Jones & C.J.French
 Pterostylis cucullata R.Br. – leafy greenhood
 Pterostylis curta R.Br. – blunt greenhood
 Pterostylis cycnocephala Fitzg. – swan greenhood
 Pterostylis daintreana F.Muell. ex Benth. – Daintree's greenhood
 Pterostylis decurva R.S.Rogers – summer greenhood
 Pterostylis depauperata F.M.Bailey – keeled greenhood
 Pterostylis despectans (Nicholls) M.A.Clem. & D.L.Jones – lowly rustyhood
 Pterostylis dilatata A.S.George – robust snail orchid
 Pterostylis diminuta (D.L.Jones) G.N.Backh. – small-flowered leafy greenhood
 Pterostylis divaricata (D.L.Jones & L.M.Copel.) L.M.Copel. & D.L.Jones
 Pterostylis diversiflora (R.J.Bates) J.M.H.Shaw
 Pterostylis dolichochila D.L.Jones & M.A.Clem. – long-tongued shell orchid
 Pterostylis dubia R.Br. – blue-tongued greenhood
 Pterostylis echinulata D.L.Jones & C.J.French – hairy-leafed snail orchid
 Pterostylis ectypha (D.L.Jones & C.J.French) D.L.Jones & C.J.French
 Pterostylis elegans D.L.Jones – elegant greenhood
 Pterostylis elegantissima (D.L.Jones & C.J.French) D.L.Jones – elegant rufous greenhood
 Pterostylis erecta T.E.Hunt - upright maroonhood
 Pterostylis eremaea (D.L.Jones & C.J.French) D.L.Jones & C.J.French
 Pterostylis erubescens  D.L.Jones & C.J.French – red sepaled snail orchid	
 Pterostylis erythroconcha M.A.Clem. & D.L.Jones – red shell orchid
 Pterostylis exalla (D.L.Jones) G.N.Backh.
 Pterostylis excelsa M.A.Clem. – tall rustyhood, dry land green-hood
 Pterostylis exquisita (D.L.Jones) D.L.Jones
 Pterostylis exserta  (D.L.Jones) D.L.Jones – exserted rufous greenhood
 Pterostylis extensa (D.L.Jones) D.L.Jones
 Pterostylis extranea (D.L.Jones) Janes & Duretto
 Pterostylis faceta (D.L.Jones & C.J.French) D.L.Jones & C.J.French
 Pterostylis falcata R.S.Rogers – sickle greenhood
 Pterostylis ferruginea (D.L.Jones) G.N.Backh. – Bangham rustyhood
 Pterostylis fischii Nicholls – Fisch's greenhood
 Pterostylis flavovirens (D.L.Jones) R.J.Bates – coastal banded greenhood
 Pterostylis foliacea (D.L.Jones) D.L.Jones
 Pterostylis foliata Hook.f. – slender greenhood
 Pterostylis frenchii (D.L.Jones) A.P.Br. – tuart rufous greenhood
 Pterostylis fuliginosa (D.L.Jones & C.J.French) D.L.Jones & C.J.French 
 Pterostylis furcata Lindl. – forked greenhood
 Pterostylis × furcillata Rupp
 Pterostylis furva (D.L.Jones) D.L.Jones
 Pterostylis galgula (D.L.Jones & C.J.French) D.L.Jones & C.J.French
 Pterostylis gibbosa R.Br. – Illawarra rustyhood, Illawarra greenhood
 Pterostylis glebosa D.L.Jones & C.J.French – clubbed snail orchid
 Pterostylis glyphida (D.L.Jones) G.N.Backh.
 Pterostylis gracilis Nicholls
 Pterostylis gracillima (D.L.Jones & C.J.French) D.L.Jones & C.J.French
 Pterostylis graminea Hook.f. – grass-leaved greenhood (N.Z.)
 Pterostylis grandiflora R.Br. – superb greenhood, cobra greenhood
 Pterostylis grossa (D.L.Jones & C.J.French) D.L.Jones
 Pterostylis hadra  (D.L.Jones) D.L.Jones
 Pterostylis hamata Blackmore & Clemesha – southern hooked rustyhood
 Pterostylis hamiltonii Nicholls – red-veined shell orchid
 Pterostylis heberlei (D.L.Jones & C.J.French) D.L.Jones & C.J.French
 Pterostylis hians D.L.Jones – opera house orchid
 Pterostylis hildae Nicholls – rainforest greenhood
 Pterostylis hispidula Fitzg. – small nodding greenhood, box greenhood
 Pterostylis humilis R.S.Rogers (N.Z.)
 Pterostylis incognita (D.L.Jones) G.N.Backh. – Sale greenhood
 Pterostylis × ingens (Rupp) D.L.Jones
 Pterostylis insectifera M.A.Clem. – insect-lipped rufous greenhood, leaden rustyhood
 Pterostylis irsoniana Hatch (N.Z.)
 Pterostylis irwinii D.L.Jones (N.Z.)
 Pterostylis jacksonii  D.L.Jones & C.J.French – southwest granite snail orchid
 Pterostylis jeanesii Reiter, Kosky & M.A.Clem.
 Pterostylis jonesii G.N.Backh. – montane leafy greenhood
 Pterostylis karri  D.L.Jones & C.J.French – karri snail orchid
 Pterostylis laxa Blackmore – antelope greenhood
 Pterostylis lepida (D.L.Jones) G.N.Backh. – Halbury greenhood
 Pterostylis leptochila M.A.Clem. & D.L.Jones – Ravensthorpe rufous greenhood, narrow-lipped rustyhood
 Pterostylis limbatus (D.L.Jones & R.J.Bates) J.M.H.Shaw
 Pterostylis lineata (D.L.Jones) G.N.Backh. – Blue Mountains leafy greenhood
 Pterostylis lingua M.A.Clem. – large-lipped rustyhood
 Pterostylis littoralis (D.L.Jones) R.J.Bates – coastal leafy greenhood
 Pterostylis loganii (D.L.Jones) G.N.Backh. – Logan's leafy greenhood
 Pterostylis longicornis (D.L.Jones & C.J.French) D.L.Jones & C.J.French
 Pterostylis longicurva Rupp – long-tongued greenhood
 Pterostylis longifolia R.Br. – common leafy greenhood, tall greenhood
 Pterostylis longipetala Rupp – curved greenhood
 Pterostylis lortensis  D.L.Jones & C.J.French – Lort River snail orchid
 Pterostylis lustra D.L.Jones – small sickle greenhood
 Pterostylis macilenta (D.L.Jones) G.N.Backh.
 Pterostylis macrocalymma M.A.Clem. & D.L.Jones – large-hooded rufous greenhood, Murchison rustyhood
 Pterostylis macrosceles  (D.L.Jones & C.J.French) D.L.Jones – slender rufous greenhood
 Pterostylis macrosepala (D.L.Jones) G.N.Backh.
 Pterostylis major (D.L.Jones) G.N.Backh.
 Pterostylis maxima M.A.Clem. & D.L.Jones – large rustyhood
 Pterostylis melagramma D.L.Jones – black-stripe leafy greenhood
 Pterostylis meridionalis (D.L.Jones & C.J.French) D.L.Jones & C.J.French
 Pterostylis metcalfei D.L.Jones – Metcalfe's greenhood, large kinked greenhood or Ebor greenhood
 Pterostylis microglossa  D.L.Jones & C.J.French – Kalbarri shell orchid
 Pterostylis micromega Hook.f. – swamp greenhood (N.Z.)
 Pterostylis microphylla  D.L.Jones & C.J.French – small rosette snail orchid
 Pterostylis mirabilis (D.L.Jones) R.J.Bates – nodding rufous-hood
 Pterostylis mitchellii Lindl. – Mitchell's rustyhood
 Pterostylis montana Hatch (N.Z.)
 Pterostylis monticola D.L.Jones – large mountain greenhood
 Pterostylis multiflora (D.L.Jones) G.N.Backh. – tall tiny greenhood
 Pterostylis multisignata (D.L.Jones) D.L.Jones
 Pterostylis mutica R.Br. – midget greenhood
 Pterostylis mystacina (D.L.Jones) Janes & Duretto
 Pterostylis nana R.Br. – dwarf snail orchid
 Pterostylis nichollsiana  (D.L.Jones) D.L.Jones
 Pterostylis nigricans D.L.Jones & M.A.Clem. – dark greenhood
 Pterostylis nutans R.Br. – nodding greenhood, parrot's beak orchid
 Pterostylis oblonga D.L.Jones – coastal maroonhood
 Pterostylis obtusa R.Br. – blunt greenhood
 Pterostylis oliveri Petrie (N.Z.)
 Pterostylis ophioglossa R.Br. – snake-tongue greenhood
 Pterostylis orbiculata D.L.Jones & C.J.French coastal banded greenhood
 Pterostylis oreophila Clemesha – Kiandra greenhood, blue-tongued greenhood
 Pterostylis ovata M.A.Clem. – Gawler Range rustyhood
 Pterostylis paludosa D.L.Jones, Molloy & M.A.Clem. – swamp greenhood
 Pterostylis papuana Rolfe
 Pterostylis parca (D.L.Jones) G.N.Backh. – Lithgow leafy greenhood
 Pterostylis parva  D.L.Jones & C.J.French – fawn snail orchid
 Pterostylis parviflora R.Br. - tiny greenhood
 Pterostylis patens Colenso (N.Z.)
 Pterostylis peakalliana Reiter, Kosky & M.A.Clem.
 Pterostylis pearsonii (D.L.Jones) Janes & Duretto
 Pterostylis pedina (D.L.Jones) Janes & Duretto
 Pterostylis pedoglossa Fitzg. – prawn greenhood
 Pterostylis pedunculata R.Br. – upright maroonhood
 Pterostylis perculta  (D.L.Jones & C.J.French) D.L.Jones – ruddy hood
 Pterostylis petiolata  (D.L.Jones) D.L.Jones
 Pterostylis petrosa D.L.Jones & M.A.Clem. – Riverina rustyhood
 Pterostylis picta M.A.Clem. – painted rufous greenhood, painted rustyhood
 Pterostylis planulata D.L.Jones & M.A.Clem. – flat rustyhood
 Pterostylis platypetala  D.L.Jones & C.J.French – broad petaled snail orchid
 Pterostylis plumosa Cady - bearded greenhood, plumed greenhood
 Pterostylis porrecta D.L.Jones, Molloy & M.A.Clem. (N.Z.)
 Pterostylis praetermissa M.A.Clem. & D.L.Jones – Mount Kaputar rustyhood
 Pterostylis prasina (D.L.Jones) G.N.Backh. – mallee leafy greenhood
 Pterostylis pratensis D.L.Jones – Liawenee greenhood
 Pterostylis precatoria (D.L.Jones & C.J.French) D.L.Jones & C.J.French
 Pterostylis procera D.L.Jones & M.A.Clem. – short-lipped greenhood
 Pterostylis psammophila (D.L.Jones) R.J.Bates – two-bristle greenhood
 Pterostylis puberula Hook.f. – dwarf greenhood, snail greenhood (N.Z.)
 Pterostylis pulchella Messmer – waterfall greenhood, escarpment greenhood or pretty greenhood
 Pterostylis pusilla R.S.Rogers – tiny rustyhood
 Pterostylis pyramidalis Lindl. - tall snail orchid, leafy snail orchid
 Pterostylis × ralphcranei D.L.Jones & M.A.Clem.
 Pterostylis readii (D.L.Jones & L.M.Copel.) D.L.Jone
 Pterostylis recurva Benth. – jug orchid, recurved shell orchid, antelope orchid or bull orchid
 Pterostylis reflexa R.Br. – dainty greenhood
 Pterostylis repanda (M.A.Clem. & D.L.Jones) J.M.H.Shaw
 Pterostylis revoluta R.Br. – autumn greenhood
 Pterostylis riparia D.L.Jones – streamside greenhood
 Pterostylis robusta R.S.Rogers – sharp-leaf greenhood
 Pterostylis roensis M.A.Clem. & D.L.Jones – painted rufous greenhood, dark rustyhood
 Pterostylis rogersii E.Coleman – curled-tongue shell orchid
 Pterostylis rubenachii D.L.Jones – Arthur River greenhood
 Pterostylis rubescens (D.L.Jones) G.N.Backh. – blushing tiny greenhood
 Pterostylis rubiginosa (D.L.Jones & L.M.Copel.) L.M.Copel. & D.L.Jones
 Pterostylis rufa R.Br. - red rustyhood
 Pterostylis russellii T.E.Hunt – Russell's greenhood
 Pterostylis sanguinea D.L.Jones & M.A.Clem. – red-banded greenhood, dark-banded greenhood
 Pterostylis sargentii C.R.P.Andrews – frog greenhood
 Pterostylis saxicola D.L.Jones & M.A.Clem. – Sydney plains rustyhood, Sydney plains greenhood
 Pterostylis saxosa (D.L.Jones & C.J.French) D.L.Jones & C.J.French
 Pterostylis saxum (D.L.Jones & C.J.French) D.L.Jones & C.J.French
 Pterostylis scabra Lindl. – green-veined shell orchid
 Pterostylis scabrella (D.L.Jones & C.J.French) D.L.Jones & C.J.French
 Pterostylis scabrida Lindl. – rough greenhood
 Pterostylis scapula  (D.L.Jones) D.L.Jones
 Pterostylis scitula  D.L.Jones & C.J.French – elegant snail orchid
 Pterostylis scoliosa D.L.Jones – small kinked greenhood
 Pterostylis setifera M.A.Clem. – bristly rustyhood, sikh's whiskers,
 Pterostylis silvicultrix (F.Muell.) D.L.Jones & M.A.Clem. – Chatham Island greenhood, tutukiwi (N.Z.)
 Pterostylis sigmoidea (D.L.Jones & C.J.French) D.L.Jones & C.J.French
 Pterostylis silvicultrix (F.Muell.) D.L.Jones & M.A.Clem.
 Pterostylis simulans R.J.Bates
 Pterostylis sinuata (D.L.Jones) Janes & Duretto – Northampton midget greenhood, western swan greenhood
 Pterostylis smaragdyna D.L.Jones & M.A.Clem. – emerald-lip leafy greenhood
 Pterostylis spatalium J.M.H.Shaw
 Pterostylis spathulata M.A.Clem. – spoon-lipped rufous greenhood, Moora rustyhood
 Pterostylis spissa (D.L.Jones) G.N.Backh. – cygnet greenhood
 Pterostylis splendens D.L.Jones & M.A.Clem. (New Caledonia)
 Pterostylis squamata R.Br. – southern rustyhood, ruddyhood
 Pterostylis stenochila D.L.Jones – narrow-lip leafy greenhood
 Pterostylis stenosepala (D.L.Jones) G.N.Backh. – narrow-sepalled leafy greenhood
 Pterostylis striata Fitzg. – mainland striped greenhood
 Pterostylis stricta Clemesha & B.Gray – northern greenhood
 Pterostylis subtilis D.L.Jones – thin mountain greenhood
 Pterostylis tanypoda D.L.Jones, Molloy & M.A.Clem. – swan greenhood (N.Z.)
 Pterostylis tasmanica D.L.Jones – small bearded greenhood
 Pterostylis taurus M.A.Clem. & D.L.Jones – little bull orchid
 Pterostylis telmata D.L.Jones & C.J.French
 Pterostylis tenuicauda Kraenzl. (New Caledonia)
 Pterostylis tenuis (D.L.Jones) G.N.Backh. – smooth leafy greenhood
 Pterostylis tenuissima Nicholls – swamp greenhood
 Pterostylis terminalis {D.L.Jones & R.J.Bates) J.M.H.Shaw
 Pterostylis thulia (D.L.Jones) Janes & Duretto
 Pterostylis timorensis Schuit. & J.J.Verm. (East Timor)
 Pterostylis timothyi (D.L.Jones) Janes & Duretto – brittle snail orchid, fawn snail orchid
 Pterostylis torquata D.L.Jones – collared greenhood
 Pterostylis × toveyana Ewart & Sharman
 Pterostylis tristis Colenso – midget greenhood (N.Z.)
 Pterostylis trullifolia Hook.f. – trowel-leaved greenhood (N.Z.)
 Pterostylis truncata Fitzg. – brittle greenhood, little dumpies
 Pterostylis tryphera (D.L.Jones & C.J.French) D.L.Jones & C.J.French
 Pterostylis tunstallii D.L.Jones & M.A.Clem. – Tunstall's greenhood, granite greenhood
 Pterostylis turfosa Endl. – bearded bird orchid
 Pterostylis tylosa (D.L.Jones & C.J.French) D.L.Jones & C.J.French
 Pterostylis uliginosa D.L.Jones – marsh greenhood
 Pterostylis umbrina (D.L.Jones) G.N.Backh. – broad-sepaled leafy greenhood
 Pterostylis unicornis (D.L.Jones) D.L.Jones
 Pterostylis valida (Nicholls) D.L.Jones
 Pterostylis venosa Colenso (N.Z.)
 Pterostylis ventricosa (D.L.Jones) G.N.Backh.
 Pterostylis venusta (D.L.Jones) D.L.Jones
 Pterostylis vernalis (D.L.Jones) G.N.Backh. – spring tiny greenhood
 Pterostylis vescula  (D.L.Jones) D.L.Jones
 Pterostylis virens (D.L.Jones & C.J.French) D.L.Jones & C.J.French
 Pterostylis viriosa (D.L.Jones) R.J.Bates – Adelaide Hills banded greenhood
 Pterostylis vitrea (D.L.Jones) Bostock – glassy leafy greenhood
 Pterostylis vittata Lindl. – banded greenhood, green-banded greenhood
 Pterostylis voigtii D.L.Jones & C.J.French
 Pterostylis wapstrarum D.L.Jones – fleshy greenhood
 Pterostylis williamsonii D.L.Jones – brown-lip leafy greenhood
 Pterostylis woollsii Fitzg. – long-tailed greenhood
 Pterostylis xerampelina (D.L.Jones & C.J.French) D.L.Jones & C.J.French
 Pterostylis xerophila M.A.Clem. – desert rustyhood, desert greenhood
 Pterostylis zebrina (D.L.Jones & C.J.French) D.L.Jones
 Pterostylis ziegeleri D.L.Jones – Cape Portland greenhood

References

External links 
 Video showing pollination of Pterostylis sanguinea.

 
Cranichideae genera
Orchids of Australia